TMED may refer to:
 Tetramethylethylenediamine, a chemical compound
 Telemedicine
 Transcendental Meditation, a form of silent, mantra meditation
 Transmembrane emp24 domain-containing protein, protein found in humans such as TMED1, etc.

See also